The 17th European Badminton Championships were held in Glasgow, Scotland, between 25 and 29 April 2000, and hosted by the European Badminton Union and the Scottish Badminton Union.

Venue
This tournament was held at the Kelvin Hall International Sports Arena, in Glasgow.

Medalists

Results

Semi-finals

Finals

Medal account

References

External links
 Tournament draw at sbg.ac.at
 Results at badmintoneurope.com
 Results at scotbadminton.demon.co.uk

European Badminton Championships
European Badminton Championships
B
Badminton tournaments in Scotland
International sports competitions in Glasgow
20th century in Glasgow
2000s in Glasgow